The 9th Canadian Film Awards were held on June 15, 1957 to honour achievements in Canadian film. The ceremony was hosted by Leonard Brockington.

Due to dissatisfaction with the organization of the awards, there were no awards presented in almost any of the traditional film categories; instead, an increased number of special awards were given to individuals and organizations, and only the Amateur Film award was presented to films.

Winners
John Grierson — "in recognition of his unique contribution to Canada's filmmaking and art industry".
Yorkton Film Council — "in recognition of its distinguished international film festival, which demonstrates the contribution of the film council movement in Canada".
Associated Screen Studios — "for its initiative in developing a program of training young personnel to meet the demands of Canada's growing film industry".
Crawley Films — "in recognition of the company's distinguished production program in the field of educational films".
Reverend Anson C. Moorehouse, United Church of Canada — "for his pioneering in the inspirational aspects of Canadian filmmaking".
Frank Radford Crawley and Judith Crawley — "for their unique contribution to Canada's filmmaking and art industry".
Lew Parry — "for his distinguished leadership in the development of a Canadian film industry".
Roy Tash — "for more than a quarter century of photographing and editing Canadian newsreels".
Don Mulholland — "for his notable encouragement of creative Canadian film production".
Harold P. Brown, E. Fred Holliday and James R. Pollock — "for their pioneering work and their continued devotion to the development of Canadian films in education".
Amateur: Prelude to Spring — John W. Ruddell director 
Honourable Mention: The Sugar Maple, Helen Webb-Smith director

References

Canadian
09
1957 in Canada